Oracle Bronto provides a cloud-based commerce marketing automation platform to mid-market and enterprise organizations.

History

In 2002, Joe Colopy and Chaz Felix founded Bronto Software in Durham, North Carolina. Bronto Software is currently based in the American Tobacco District of Durham, North Carolina. The company was named after Joe Colopy's childhood interest in dinosaurs. 

In 2011, Bronto Software significantly expanded its office space to accommodate business growth. In March 2012, Bronto opened an office in London to develop business growth in Europe. 

In 2011, Bronto grew with a 54% increase in revenue and team growth of 40%, finishing the year with 118 employees. In September 2012, Bronto was named the leading self-service email provider and the second overall leading email service provider according to the Internet Retailer Top 1000. After 2012, Bronto had 152 employees and offices in Durham, NC,  and London, UK. Bronto Software expanded operations in February 2014 by opening an office in Sydney, Australia. 

On August 13, 2014, Bronto announced that they had doubled their world headquarters at the American Tobacco Campus in Durham, NC, adding 47,000 square feet for a total of 80,000 square feet. According to Bronto CEO Joe Colopy, "The move reflects our focus on high growth and further supports our goal of remaining one of the preeminent places to work in the Triangle and being a center for software innovation."

In April 2015, NetSuite (now Oracle NetSuite, after Oracle acquired Netsuite in 2016) signed an agreement to acquire Bronto Software for $200 million.

On March 2, 2021, Oracle NetSuite sent an email to some customers with the news that the company had assigned the core product suite, Bronto Email Marketing Platform, to “end of life” status and shut down all services on May 31, 2022.

Products and services
The Bronto Marketing Platform includes the ability to build flowcharts for campaigns, automate the campaigns, and report on the results. The platform lets customers integrate their email, SMS, Twitter, and Facebook campaigns. The platform also includes a complete API for custom integrations and standard integrations with partners like Magento, Omniture, Google, Demandware, MarketLive, and other web analytics and e-commerce providers.

Bronto Software hosts an annual multi-day user conference to discuss e-commerce marketing through email, mobile, and social campaigns. This event is usually in mid-April in Chapel Hill, North Carolina. The 2011 event featured keynote presentations from CEO Joe Colopy, COO Chaz Felix, and Sucharita Mulpuru, a principal analyst with Forrester Research. Bronto Summit 2012 featured retail expert Lauren Freedman (The e-tailing group), Anne Holland (Anne Holland Ventures, WhichTestWon), and journalist Ken Magill. Converge on Commerce, Bronto Summit 2013, featured keynotes by CEO Joe Colopy, Bryan Eisenberg, and Donna Iucolano. Bronto Summit 2014 brought together speakers including Gary Vaynerchuk, Jamie Clarke, CEO and co-founder of LiveOutThere.com, and entrepreneurs Tom Lotrecchiano and Joe Schmidt, founders of CanvasOnDemand and other companies.

Recognition

Inc Magazine has ranked Bronto Software on their Inc 5000 list for six consecutive years (20092014). Bronto Software was also marked as one of the 100 fastest-growing software companies in North America.

NCTA awarded Bronto their Software Company of the Year Award in 2011, and the Triangle Business Journal ranked Bronto No. 18 on their Fast 50, a list of the fastest-growing privately owned companies in the Triangle.

Bronto Software won the Stevie Award for Best Customer Service Department from the American Business Awards in 2009 and 2010. Bronto was named one of the Best Places to Work by the Triangle Business Journal in 2010, 2011, 2012, and 2014. Bronto Software was a SIIA CODiE Award finalist for Best Marketing Solution in 2011 and 2012, and a finalist for Best Marketing Automation Solution in 2014, 2015 and 2016.

References

Software companies based in North Carolina
Companies based in Durham, North Carolina
Companies established in 2002
2002 establishments in North Carolina
Defunct software companies of the United States